This is a list of federations affiliated with the Fédération Internationale de Motocyclisme.

Europe
  — Union Européenne de Motocyclisme (FIM Europe)
  — Federacio Motociclista d’Andorra
  — Oesterreichischer Automobil- Motorrad- und Touring Club
  — Belarusian Federation of Motorcycle Sport and Bicycle Motocross Sport
  — Fédération Motocycliste de Belgique
  — Bosanskohercegovački Auto-Moto Klub
  — Българска Федерация Мотоциклетизъм
  — Hrvatski Motociklisticki Savez
  — Κυπριακή Ομοσπονδία Μοτοσυκλέτας
  — Autoklub České republiky
  — Danmarks Motor Union
  — Eesti Mootorrattaspordi Föderatsioon
  — Suomen Moottoriliitto r.y.
  — Fédération française de motocyclisme
  — Deutscher Motor Sport Bund e. V.
  — Automobile and Touring Club of Greece
  — Magyar Motorsport Szövetség
  — Motorcycle and Snowmobile Sports Association of Iceland
  — Motor Cycle Union of Ireland (includes Northern Ireland)
  — Federazione Motociclistica Italiana
  — Latvijas Motosporta Federācija
  — Liechtensteiner Motorrad-Verband
  — Lithuanian Motorcycle Sport Federation
  — Motor Union du Grand Duché de Luxembourg
  - Assocjazjoni Sport Muturi u Karozzi
  — Moto Club de Monaco http://mcm.mc/
  — Auto-moto Savez Crne Gore
  — Koninklijke Nederlandse Motorrijders Vereniging
  — Norges Motorsportforbund
  — Polski Związek Motorowy
  — Portuguese Motorcycling Federation
  — Motorcycle Federation of Russia
  — Auto-Moto Savez Srbije
  — Slovenská Motocyklová Federácia
  — Avto-Moto Zveza Slovenije
  — Real Federación Motociclista Española
  — Svenska Motorcykel- och Snöskoterförbundet
  — Avto Moto Sojuz na Makedonija
  — Fédération Motocycliste Suisse
  — Auto-Cycle Union (excludes Northern Ireland)

Africa
  — Fédération Algérienne des Sports Mécaniques
  — Fédération Ivoirienne de Sports Automobile et Motocyclisme
  — Automobile and Touring Club of Egypt
  — Fédération Royale Marocaine de Motocyclisme
  — Namibia Motor Sport Federation
  — Motorsport South Africa

Asia
  — United Arab Emirates Motorcycle Club
  — Bahrain Motor Federation
  — 中国摩托车运动协会网
  — Hong Kong Automobile Association
  — The Federation of Motor Sports Clubs of India
  — Ikatan Motor Indonesia
  — Automobile & Motorcycle Federation of I.R. Iran
  — Automobile & Touring Club of Israel
  — Royal Motorcycle Club of Jordan
  — Motorcycle Federation of Japan
  — Automotorsport Federation of the Republic of Kazakhstan
  — Korea Motorcycle Federation
  — Kuwait International Automobile Club
  — Lebanese Motorcycles Club
  — Federation of Motorcycle Sports in Sri Lanka
  — Automovel Clube de Macau China
  — Motorsports Association of Malaysia
  — Mongolian Automobile Motorcycle Sports Federation
  — Nepal Automobile Sports Association
  — National Motorcycle Sports and Safety Association
  — Qatar Motor and Motorcycling Federation
  — Saudi Arabian Motor Federation
  — Singapore Motor Sports Association
  — Syrian Automobile Club
  — Federation of Motor Sports Clubs of Thailand
  — Auto-Moto Federation of Tajikistan
  — 中華賽車會

North America
  — Canadian Motorcycle Association
  — Moto Club de Costa Rica
  — Federación Cubana de Motociclismo
  — Federación Dominicana de Motociclismo
  — Federación Salvadoreña de Motociclismo
  — Federación Nacional de Motociclismo de Guatemala
  — Federación Mexicana de Motociclismo A.C.
  — Unión Nicaragüense de Motociclismo
  — Unión Panameña de Motociclismo
  — American Motorcyclist Association

South America
  — Confederación Argentina de Motociclismo Deportivo
  — Federación Boliviana de Motociclismo
  — Confederaçao Brasileira de Motociclismo
  — Federación de Motociclismo de Chile
  — Federación Colombiana de Motociclismo
  — Federación Ecuatoriana de Motociclismo
  — Federación Paraguaya de Motociclismo
  — Federación Peruana de Motociclismo
  - Federación Uruguaya de Motociclismo
  - Federación Motociclista Venezolana

Oceania
  — Motorcycling Australia
  — Guam Motorcycle and ATV Corporation
  — Motorcycling New Zealand

Worldwide
 WorldSBK (WorldSSP/WorldSSP300)
 MotoGP (Moto2/Moto3)

References

Fédération Internationale de Motocyclisme